Shanghai Pudong International Airport  is one of two international airports serving Shanghai and a major aviation hub of East Asia. Pudong Airport serves both international flights and a smaller number of domestic fights, while the city's other major airport, Shanghai–Hongqiao, mainly serves domestic and regional flights in East Asia. The airport is operated by Shanghai Airport Authority.

The airport is the main hub for China Eastern Airlines and Shanghai Airlines, and a major international hub for Air China, as well as a secondary hub for China Southern Airlines. It is also the hub for privately owned Juneyao Airlines and Spring Airlines, and an Asia-Pacific cargo hub for FedEx, UPS and DHL. The DHL hub, opened in July 2012, is reportedly the largest express hub in Asia.

Pudong Airport had two main passenger terminals, flanked on both sides by four operational parallel runways. A third passenger terminal was opened in 2021, in addition to a satellite terminal and two additional runways, which will raise its annual capacity from 60 million passengers to 80 million, along with the ability to handle six million tons of freight.

Pudong Airport is a fast-growing hub for both passenger and cargo traffic. With 3,703,431 metric tons handled in 2017, the airport is the world's third-busiest airport by cargo traffic. Pudong Airport also served a total of 74,006,331 passengers in 2018, making it the third-busiest airport in China after Beijing–Capital and Hong Kong, fifth-busiest in Asia, and the eighth-busiest in the world. It is also the busiest international gateway of mainland China, with 35.25 million international passengers. By the end of 2016, Pudong Airport hosted 104 airlines serving more than 210 destinations.

Shanghai Pudong is the busiest international hub in China, and about half of its total passenger traffic is international. Pudong Airport is connected to Shanghai Hongqiao Airport by Shanghai Metro Line 2 and the Shanghai Maglev Train via Pudong International Airport Station. There are also airport buses connecting it with the rest of the city.

History

Early development 
Prior to the establishment of Pudong International Airport, Shanghai Hongqiao International Airport was the only primary airport of Shanghai. During the 1990s, the expansion of Hongqiao Airport to meet growing demand became impossible as the surrounding urban area was developing significantly, and an alternative to assume all international flights had to be sought. 

After deliberation, the municipal government decided to adopt the suggestion from Professor Chen Jiyu of East China Normal University, who wrote a letter to the Mayor of Shanghai Xu Kuangdi  suggesting that the new airport should be constructed on the tidal flats of the south bank of the Yangtze River estuary, on the coast of the Pudong development zone to the east of Shanghai.

Construction of the first phase of the new Shanghai Pudong International Airport began in October 1997, took two years to build at a cost of RMB 12 billion (US$1.67 billion), and was opened on 16 September 1999. The first phase of the airport has one 4E category runway (4000 m x 60 m) along with two parallel taxiways, an  apron, seventy-six aircraft positions and a  cargo warehouse. 

A second runway was opened on 17 March 2005, and construction of phase two (including a second terminal, a third runway and a cargo terminal) began in December 2005 and started operation on 26 March 2008, in time for the Beijing 2008 Summer Olympics.

In November 2011, Pudong Airport received approval from the national government for a new round of expansion which includes two runways. The 3,800-metre fourth runway, along with an auxiliary taxiway and traffic control facilities, is projected to cost 2.58 billion yuan (US$403 million). The 3,400-metre fifth runway, along with a new traffic tower, will cost 4.65 billion yuan (US$726.6 million). Construction was completed in 2015 and has doubled the capacity of the airport.

Ongoing expansion 
Pudong International Airport officially started the third phase of the Pudong International Airport expansion with the construction on a new south satellite terminal on 29 December 2015. The new satellite terminal will be the world's largest single satellite terminal with a total construction area of 622,000 square meters, which is larger than the Pudong International Airport T2 terminal building (485,500 square meters). The satellite terminal is composed of two halls, S1 and S2, forming an H-shaped structure. It will have an annual design capacity of 38 million passengers, The total cost of the project is estimated to be about 20.6 billion yuan. Halls S1 and S2 will have 83 gates. A high capacity people mover connecting T1 to SI and T2 to S2 will be constructed. After the completion of the satellite terminal in 2019, Pudong International Airport will have an annual passenger capacity of 80 million passengers, ranking among the top ten airports in the world.

As of October 2019, the satellite S1 is in operation and connected by MRT to T1.

Facilities 
The airport has 162 boarding bridges (T1-31 T2-41 Satellite terminal-90) along with 189 remote gates. Four runways are parallel to the terminals (four operational): one  runway with 4E rating (capable of accommodating aircraft up to Boeing 747-400), two  runways with 4F rating (capable of accommodating aircraft up to Airbus A380, Boeing 747-8, and Antonov An-225), and two  runways with 4F rating .

Pudong airport currently has four runways. Rwy 35L/17R and Rwy 34R/16L are mostly used for landing while Rwy 35R/17L and Rwy 34L/16R are mostly used for takeoff. Runway 15/33 is not in operation.

Terminal 1 
Terminal 1 was opened on 1 October 1999 along with a 4000-metre runway and a cargo hub. It was built to handle the demand for traffic and to relieve Shanghai Hongqiao International Airport's traffic. The exterior of Terminal 1 is shaped like a seagull, and has 28 gates, 13 of which are double-decker gates. The capacity of Terminal 1 is 20 million passengers. It currently has 204 check-in counters, thirteen luggage conveying belts and covers an area of 280,000 square metres.

The gates for Terminal 1 is 1–12, 14–32 (linked with jetway), while the remote gates are 200–203, 251–258 (Domestic), 208–212, 213–216 (International).

Terminal 2 
Terminal 2, opened to public and officially opened on 26 March 2008, along with the third runway, is capable of handling 60 million passengers and 4.2 million tons of cargo annually. Terminal 2 is shaped like Terminal 1, although it more closely resembles a wave, and is slightly larger than Terminal 1. Terminal 2 also has more floor areas than Terminal 1. Terminal 2 is primarily used by Air China and other Star Alliance members.

The gates for Terminal 2 are 50–65, 67–79, 80–98 (Note that gates 58–90 are used by both the C gates (used for domestic flights) and the D gates (used for international flights). The gates between gates 65–79 are only odd numbered (65, 67, 69, 71, 73, 75, 77, 79). Gates 50–57 and gates 92–98 are used for C gates only. The remote gates for Terminal 2 are C219-C224 for domestic and D228-D232 for international.

Satellite concourses 

Construction on an additional satellite concourse facility that could accommodate further gates and terminal space started on 29 December 2015 and was inaugurated in September 2019. It is the largest stand-alone satellite airport terminal buildings in the world at 622,000 square meters. This project will support 38 million passengers annually through 90 departure gates across two S1 and S2 concourses.  Gates for domestic flights are labelled H in both S1 and S2 terminal, while G is labelled for International flights gates in both S1 and S2 terminal.

Automatic People Mover 

Both S1 and S2 are connected together and are since the opening in September 2019 connected by an 7.8 km underground Shanghai Pudong Airport APM to the current T1 and T2 terminals operated by Shanghai Keolis for 20 years, including the East Line and the West Line. The operating section of the East Line is 1.65 km long, connecting Terminal 2 and Satellite 2, and the operating section of the West Line is 1.86 km long, connecting Terminal 1 and Satellite 1.

A380/B747-8 stands 
Gates that can accommodate the A380/B747-8 are 24 (T1)  71,75 (T2)  119,121 (S1)  504-507 (remote stands near S1, on taxiway L02, between taxiway P3 and south of P2) 168, 170, 173 (S2)

A-CDM implementation 

The airport has been using the Airport Collaborative Decision Making system (A-CDM) developed by the aviation data service company VariFlight since January 2017. The system is aimed to improve on-time performance and safety of the airport's operations. By June 2017, Shanghai Pudong airport recorded 62.7% punctuality rate, which was a 15% increase compared to the same period previous year.

Airlines and destinations

Passenger 
Pudong Airport mainly serves international flights along with flights to Baotou, Changchun, Dalian, Zhangjiajie and some smaller cities while most domestic flights are operating at Hongqiao Airport. However, some domestic flights operating at Hongqiao Airport only may move to Pudong Airport operating only at Pudong Airport instead of both.

Cargo

Statistics

Ground transportation

Highway 
North: S1 Yingbin Expressway and Huaxia Elevated Road
South: Shanghai–Jiaxing–Huzhou Expressway and G1501 Shanghai Ring Expressway

Maglev train 
Starting service on 29 January 2004, as the first commercial high-speed maglev railway in the world, Shanghai Maglev Train links Pudong International Airport with Longyang Road Metro Station, where transfer to Line 2, Line 7, and Line 16 is possible. The  ride from Longyang Road Metro station to Pudong International Airport typically takes around eight minutes, with the maximum speed reaching . Trains operate every 15 minutes; therefore passengers can expect to arrive in less than 25 minutes, waiting time included.

All cars are equipped with racks and space designated for luggage.

Shanghai Metro Line 2 
Shanghai Metro Line 2 also provides service between Pudong International Airport and Longyang Road, Lujiazui, People's Square, and Hongqiao International Airport, Shanghai's primary domestic airport as well as Shanghai Hongqiao Railway Station. Line 2 is part of the Shanghai Metro system; therefore unlike the Maglev, free in-system transfer to other lines are possible.

Prices and speeds are substantially lower than the Maglev. A casual ride to People's Square, the city center, typically takes just over one hour, while a trip to Hongqiao International Airport takes about 1.5 hour.

The east extension of Line 2 used to run in an independent pattern between Guanglan Road and Pudong Airport, in which the train would not run west of Guanglan Road and passengers had to transfer at this station. The regular service between East Xujing and Pudong Airport started in April 2019, allowing passengers to access the city center without the extra transfer. The regular service completely replaced the independent east extension service in October of the same year when the four-carriage trainsets special for the service started to be transformed into eight-carriage trainsets for the regular service.

Future plan 
The plan for building a new commuter railway line connecting the airport with Hongqiao Airport, Airport Link line, has been formally established in 2015 and approved in December 2018 by National Development and Reform Commission. The line is under construction since 28 June 2019 and is expected to be put in operation by the end of 2024. This 68.6 km railway starts from Shanghai East railway station under planning, via Zhangjiang and Sanlin in Pudong, Huajing in Xuhui and Qibao in Minhang. It will use the unused area in Hongqiao Railway Station originally for Maglev for its station at Hongqiao Transportation Hub.

Metro Line 21 Phase II east extension will connect the airport with the under construction adjacent Shanghai East railway station and the eastside of Pudong.

Airport buses 

Eight airport bus lines serve the airport, providing rapid links to various destinations.
 Airport Bus Route 1: To Shanghai Hongqiao railway station via Shanghai Hongqiao International Airport
 Airport Bus Route 2: To Jing'an Temple (City Terminal Hub)
 Airport Bus Route 4: To Hongkou Stadium Hub (Huayuan Road), via Deping Road at Pudong Avenue, Wujiaochang and Dabaishu
 Airport Bus Route 5: To Shanghai railway station, via Longyang Road Metro Station, Century Avenue at South Pudong Road (Lujiazui) and East Yan'an Road at Middle Zhejiang Road (People's Square)
 Airport Bus Route 7: To Shanghai South railway station, via West Huaxia Road at Shangnan Road and East Huaxia Road at Chuansha Road (Chuansha)
 Airport Bus Route 8: To Nanhui Coach and Bus Station
 Airport Bus Route 9: To Xinzhuang Metro Station
 Airport Bus Ring Route 1: To Hangchengyuan (Shiwan), via stops in Airport Workplace

Accidents and incidents 
On 28 November 2009, Avient Aviation Flight 324, an Avient Aviation McDonnell Douglas MD-11F cargo plane registered to Zimbabwe (registration: Z-BAV) departing for Kyrgyzstan crashed into a warehouse near the runway of the airport due to a tailstrike that caught fire during takeoff and broke into several pieces with seven people on board. Three people died and four were injured.
On 22 July 2020, an Ethiopian Airlines Cargo Boeing 777 freighter aircraft caught fire while at Pudong International Airport as it prepared for a trip to São Paulo, Brazil and to Santiago, Chile via Addis Ababa, shortly after landing from Brussels, Belgium. No injuries were reported.

Photo gallery

See also 

Shanghai Hongqiao International Airport
List of airports in China
List of the busiest airports in China

References

External links 

 Shanghai Airports
 Shanghai Airports 
Airliners.Net photos of Shanghai Pudong International Airport
 
 

1999 establishments in China
Airports established in 1999
Airports in Shanghai
Government-owned companies of China
Pudong